Jonathan Phillip "Sugarfoot" Moffett (born November 17, 1954) is an American drummer, songwriter and producer from New Orleans, Louisiana. Beginning in 1979, Moffett collaborated with the Jackson family, particularly Michael Jackson, over the course of 30 years. More recently, he has worked with other notable artists and producers such as Madonna, George Michael, Elton John, Stevie Wonder, Quincy Jones and many others.

Early life 
Moffett is the third of a musical family of siblings. His two other brothers played the guitar and the bass guitar, while Jonathan's father encouraged him to drum. His influences are Zigaboo, Buddy Rich, Louis Bellson, Billy Cobham, James Brown, Stevie Wonder, Roger Taylor and other drummers, mostly originating from New Orleans.

He initially wanted to play the bass guitar long before drums. He was always acutely aware of the bass guitar parts in songs and mimicked them on the bass drum. Moffett was never musically trained and learned to play drums on his own by ear. He was nicknamed "Sugarfoot" for his quick, articulate, and pronounced bass drum work, which requires a lot of precision and stamina for a drummer. He plays 16th note, 32nd note, and 64th note figures energetically and fluidly within rhythms. Moffett started off his drumming career by performing locally with prominent bands within the region and at nightclubs as a young boy.

He came up with his kung-fu inspired signature moves during a marathon practice session late one evening - the "one-handed cymbal catch" and his "backlash-whiplash" cymbal crashes (single and/or double hand) where he places two cymbals behind him and crashes/chokes them without looking.

Career

The Jacksons

Initial audition 
Moffett's professional career initially started with The Jacksons. In 1979, through serendipity, he came across The Jackson's musical director, James McField, who told him they were auditioning for a new drummer. Though the final auditions were that day, they extended it for him, knowing how eager he was to play for the group. According to an article by Robyn Flans in Drummer Magazine in September 1984, Moffett said:He [McField] called that night and the audition was set for the next day. I was familiar with their songs [The Jacksons] because I had grown up with their music, yet I didn't know everything about the music...After we finished a few songs, they pulled me aside and said they'd let me know something soon. That evening, I got the call and they said they wanted me to join the group. It was just a miracle.

Touring with The Jacksons 
His first major tour was the Destiny Tour (22.1.1979 – 13.1.1980) with The Jacksons. After his first show with the group, Michael Jackson was in awe by Moffett's ability to keep up with his dancing, always accenting his dance moves, which gave his dancing more power and prominence. He also used his "one-handed cymbal catch" frequently, in which Moffett explained to Zildjian:With the Jacksons, I'll use it to accent certain moments before the vocal chorus. OR when Michael makes a move and stops real quick, I'll accent that with a catch. You've got to do it fast and drop back into the rhythm without breaking time.He proceeded to perform on the Triumph Tour (8.7.1981 – 26.9.1981) with The Jacksons in 1981, which Rolling Stone later named as one of the best 25 tours of 1967 to 1987. Epic decided to have one of the shows from the tour recorded due to its immense popularity and success. Moffett also drummed around the United States and Canada for the record-breaking and famous Victory Tour (6.7.1984 – 9.12.1984), where he met Madonna backstage who asked him to drum for her upcoming The Virgin Tour (10.4.1985 – 11.6.1985). The Jacksons' Victory Tour promoted Michael Jackson's albums Off the Wall (1979) and Thriller (1982) and was promoted by Don King. Moffett performed with Eddie Van Halen, who made a few special appearances on some of the shows playing "Beat It" on guitar. Prince complimented Moffett after many shows with The Jacksons (and did the same seeing him live with other artists). He'd nod his head, smile, and say, "That was bad, you're bad".[5]

When Moffett turned professional, he designed innovative futuristic drum kits for every tour to complement the stage design. His work with The Jacksons and unique drumming style led him to become one of the most in-demand pop music drummers and perform on 23 world tours.

Pepsi commercial 
Moffett was with Michael and the Jackson brothers during the infamous Pepsi commercial shoot in 1984 when Michael suffered from second-degree burns from the blazing pyrotechnics. He noticed the flames on Michael's hair at one point during the shoot and dropped his drum sticks and ran to help him just as some crew members did the same.

In the studio and The Jacksons Live! album 
He is credited for live drumming on The Jacksons Live! (1981) album, which is RIAA-certified Gold. The double-disc album contains recordings of songs performed throughout the Triumph Tour (8.7.1981 – 26.9.1981). He also later recorded on The Jacksons' albums Victory (1984) and 2300 Jackson Street (1989).

Madonna

First three Madonna tours 
After their initial meet during The Jacksons Victory Tour (July 6, 1984 – December 9, 1984), Moffett finally agreed to tour with Madonna on her debut tour, The Virgin Tour (April 10, 1985 – June 11, 1985) alongside Victory Tour bandmate, Patrick Leonard (musical director/keyboardist). The tour took place only in the United States and Canada. He was featured on Madonna's 1985 "Dress You Up" music video which was basically concert footage of her singing the song from The Virgin Tour. With the success of the tour, which was also released as a video album, Madonna requested Moffett to tour with her on her second tour, Who's That Girl Tour (June 14, 1987 – September 6, 1987). The tour took place on a global level and was a huge commercial success, superseding the previous tour, and he finally toured with her on her controversial yet groundbreaking Blond Ambition Tour (April 13, 1990 – May 8, 1990), which received accolades for its intricate choreography and stage production. The tour was followed by a 1991 motion picture film, Madonna: Truth or Dare, which Moffett was featured in.

In the studio 
Moffett also recorded on three Madonna albums with producer Patrick Leonard: True Blue (1986), Like a Prayer (1989), and I'm Breathless (1990). He recorded drums, percussion, and background vocals on all three albums.

Live Aid in 1985 
He performed with the pop star at Live Aid in 1985 performing her hit songs including "Holiday", "Into the Groove", and "Love Makes the World Go Round" with guest stars Nile Rodgers, Tom Bailey and Alannah Currie, and The Thompson Twins.

Elton John

Touring with John 
Elton turned to Moffett for his comeback Reg Strikes Back Tour (9.9.1988 – 10.6.1989) with a total of 87 shows and which he utilized to fight bad press. Elton again hired Moffett for his Sleeping with the Past Tour (28.7.1989 – 20.5.1990) a total of 74 shows.

In the studio with John 
Moffett drummed on Elton's Sleeping with the Past (1989) album, which was Elton's best selling album in Denmark – where the album was recorded. It was more successful than the tour. The album was also Elton's first platinum album since 1983 with many hit singles. Moffett was also credited on To Be Continued a four-disc box set, recorded on various locations between 1965 and 1991, that chronicled Elton's songs from his days with Bluesology to the present day; it included newly recorded songs. He was also credited for live drumming on Elton's Duets (1993) album for the song "Don't Let the Sun Go Down on Me" which was recorded live with George Michael at Wembley Arena in 1991. He is also credited on Two Rooms: Celebrating the Songs of Elton John & Bernie Taupin (1991) and was additionally featured in the 1991 TV movie Two Rooms: A Tribute to Elton John & Bernie Taupin.

George Michael

Touring with Michael and "Rock in Rio" music festival 
George Michael called Moffett to tour with him on his Cover to Cover tour (15.1.1991 – 31.10.1991) totaling 30 shows and which took place in the United Kingdom, Brazil, Japan, Canada and the United States. Moffett also performed with Michael at the Rock in Rio Music Festival, which is a recurring music festival in Rio de Janeiro, Brazil.

Janet Jackson 
He toured with Janet Jackson on her janet. World Tour (24.11.1993 – 22.4.1995). The tour took place throughout North America, Europe, Asia, and Australia. Moffett did the first leg of the tour with Jackson.

Michael Jackson's solo career 

Moffett continued to perform with Michael Jackson throughout the duration of his solo career on various shows and tours such as his performance on the 30th Annual Grammy Awards in 1988 with the songs "The Way You Make Me Feel" and "Man in the Mirror" and joined Jackson on his third and final tour, the HIStory World Tour (7.9.1996 – 15.10.1997). He also drummed for the Michael Jackson: 30th Anniversary Celebration shows at the Madison Square Garden in New York City on September 7 and 10, 2001 and United We Stand: What More Can I Give benefit concert led by Jackson himself in Washington D.C. among several others on October 21, 2001.

Michael Jackson: 30th anniversary celebration 
Moffett drummed for The Michael Jackson: 30th Anniversary Celebration which took place on September 7 and 10, 2001. The concerts aired as a two-hour television special on CBS, honoring Michael Jackson's thirtieth year as a solo artist. The television special included footages from both shows. Moffett drummed with the rest of the band on the balcony right above the performers. Some of the guests and performers included Marlon Brando, Elizabeth Taylor, Macaulay Culkin, Slash, Liza Minnelli, Destiny's Child, Britney Spears, Gloria Estefan, Ray Charles, Chris Tucker, Usher, and more.

Michael Jackson and Diana Ross collaboration 
Jackson asked Moffett to collaborate on a song he wrote for Diana Ross titled "Muscles". Moffett played both drums and percussions on the track. The song was named after Jackson's pet snake and released in 1982. It was an instant hit and reached #10 on the Billboard Hot 100.

"This Is It" rehearsals and film 
Moffett was supposed to perform on Jackson's This Is It Tour (13.7.2009 – 6.3.2010), rehearsing for months, but it never happened as Jackson died before its launch.

He was featured in Michael Jackson's This Is It (2009) documentary motion picture film alongside many other concert films, shows, and documentaries. This Is It's worldwide gross revenue was $261 million, making it the highest-grossing concert film of all time. There are snippets of him drumming throughout the documentary as well as discussing the concert series that never came to be and his history with Jackson.

Friendship with Michael Jackson 
Though Moffett was known as "Sugarfoot" to the rest of the world, Michael cut his stage name short and called him "Foot" instead. Moffett was Michael Jackson's live drummer of choice from the beginning when he first started drumming with The Jacksons. Michael always called him first for each tour and show, even when he was under contract with other artists. The two collaborated over the course of 30 years starting in 1979 to 2009 with a total of four tours together; This Is It (13.7.2009 – 6.3.2010) would have been the fifth. Aside from working with Michael, he was friends with him and hung out at The Jackson Estate (Hayvenhurst home) with the family (including with Jackson family matriarch, Katherine Jackson, who he considers his "second mother") and one-on-one with Michael at Neverland Ranch and his other homes. The two had drawing contests on the road when touring and Jackson sent him birthday and holiday cards when they were not together. Moffett was with him the night before he died until 1 AM.

Memorial service at the Staples Center 
Moffett performed at the Staples Center for Michael Jackson's memorial service.

Cirque du Soleil's "Michael Jackson: The Immortal World Tour" 
Following Michael Jackson's passing, Moffett drummed around the world honoring the pop star with Cirque du Soleil's Michael Jackson: The Immortal World Tour (2.10.2011 – 31.8.2014). The tour is listed as one of the top-grossing tours of all time with a gross revenue of $360 million totaling 501 shows at 157 venues in 28 countries worldwide.

Tribute to Michael Jackson at AIMS 
Moffett also performed at the Australian Music Show (AIMS) and hosted a drum clinic in which he performed ten Michael Jackson songs that were supposed to be on This Is It.

Motown to Off the Wall documentary 
Most recently he was featured in Spike Lee's 2016 Michael Jackson's Journey from Motown to Off the Wall documentary, which was Lee's second documentary on Michael Jackson since Bad 25 (2012). The documentary was released with the reissue of the Off the Wall (1979) album. Moffett spoke of his initial audition with The Jacksons and early days with Michael and the group.

Artist collaborations 
Throughout his career, Moffett has worked with:

 3T
 Anthony Vincent
 Babyface
 Barry Manilow
 Cameo
 Chico DeBarge
 Diana Ross
 David Cassidy
 Edgar Winter
 Elton John
 George Michael
 Go West
 Isaac Hayes
 Janet Jackson
 Jasmine Guy
 Jermaine Jackson
 Jon Gibson
 Julian Lennon
 Kenny G
 La Toya Jackson
 Lindsey Buckingham
 Lionel Richie
 Madonna
 Mark Ronson
 Michael Jackson
 Patti Austin
 Peter Cetera (ex-Chicago)
 Prince (recorded on the same tracks with Madonna such as "Like A Prayer" and "Keep It Together")
 Quincy Jones
 Richard Marx
 Rick James
 Siedah Garrett
 Stevie Wonder
 The Jacksons
 The O'Jays
 Timothy B. Schmit (ex-Poco & Eagles)
 Tina Marie
 Tito Jackson
 Vasco Rossi
 Wilson Phillips
 Yarbrough and Peoples and many other artists

Equipment 
Jonathan Moffett is currently sponsored by Drum Workshop (DW), Remo Drum Heads, Empire Ear Monitors, Earthworks Microphones, Roland, Audeze Headphones, QSC and Gruv Gear. Over the years he has played a variety of cymbals including Zildjian and Istanbul Mehmet. Additionally he designed his own signature Jonathan Moffett Duo drum sticks in 1996 and designed his own cymbal called the Moffett "M" Series with Soultone back when he endorsed them, but later had a falling out with the company. He is currently in the process of designing his very own drum products and has an upcoming line of drum sticks coming out called “Sweet Beats”, which will be sold on his web store, the Moffett Store.

Publications 
Moffett has been featured in the following: Modern Drummer, Rolling Stone, DRUM! Magazine, Drummer Magazine, People, Rhythm magazine, Drummer World, Batteur Magazine, US Weekly, Ebony, Batterie Magazine, RIGHT ON!, The Drum Channel, Jet Magazine, Beat Magazine and a variety of other notable magazines, publications and blogs.

Awards 
 YouTube Silver Creator Award (2018)
 Destiny (The Jacksons): RIAA Platinum Award (1978)
 Shake Your Body (Down to the Ground) (The Jacksons): RIAA Gold Award (1979)
 Triumph (The Jacksons): RIAA Platinum Award (1979)
 The Jacksons Live! (The Jacksons): RIAA Platinum Award (1981)
 Victory (The Jacksons): RIAA Platinum Award (1984)
 True Blue (Madonna): RIAA Platinum Award (1986)
 Sleeping with the Past (Elton John): RIAA Platinum Award (1989)
 Like a Prayer (Madonna): RIAA Platinum Award (1989)
 I'm Breathless: Music from and Inspired by the Film Dick Tracy (Madonna): RIAA Platinum Award (1990)
 Rush Street (Richard Marx): RIAA Platinum Award (1991)
 Janet (Janet Jackson): RIAA Platinum Award (1993)
 Paid Vacation (Richard Marx): RIAA Platinum Award (1994)

 HIStory: Past, Present and Future, Book I (Michael Jackson): RIAA Platinum Award (1995)
 Blood On the Dance Floor (Michael Jackson): RIAA Platinum Award (1997)

 Television performances 
He has performed on countless television shows including on Good Morning America (with The Jacksons), Grammy Awards (with Michael Jackson), The Tonight Show with Johnny Carson, The Tonight Show with Jay Leno, Saturday Night Live, many times on the Arsenio Hall Show (with Brenda Russell, The O'Jays, Jasmine Guy, Wilson Phillips, Lindsey Buckingham, Go West, etc.), Solid Gold (with Greg Phillinganes and Cameo), Top of the Pops, The A-Team (with Isaac Hayes and Rick James), and countless others. Some of the tours he was on with Michael Jackson and Madonna aired as television specials, including on HBO.

 Legacy 
Moffett's drumming techniques and style are often mimicked by drummers all over the world to this day, and his work is taught in various music schools. His drum beat on "Don't Stop the Music" (1981) which he recorded with the Yarbrough and Peoples has been sampled by a multitude of modern artists (over 45 times) including on TLC's "Let's Do It Again" (1994), Nuttin Nyce's "Froggy Style" (1995), P. Diddy's "Don't Stop What You're Doin'" (1997), on the soundtracks Soul Food and Playa, and by artists Eve, Alicia Keys, Keyshia Cole, Fat Pat, Beyonce, Missy Elliott, Tichina Arnold, and many others. Rapper 2Pac sampled the song in 1996 on his unreleased original version of "Don't Stop". This song, however, was remixed for his 2006 Pac's Life'' album.

Filmography

Discography

Albums

Songs

References

External links 
 Official website
 Jonathan Moffett credits at AllMusic
 Jonathan Moffett discography, album releases & credits at Discogs.com
 Top 500 Drummers – Jonathan "Sugarfoot" Moffett at DrummerWorld.com
 Jonathan "Sugarfoot" Moffett Interview NAMM Oral History Library (2019)

Living people
Musicians from New Orleans
1954 births
20th-century American drummers
American male drummers
20th-century American male musicians
Elton John Band members